Laetitia Salles (born 29 October 1982) is a French female rugby union player. She represented  at the 2006 Women's Rugby World Cup, and 2010 Women's Rugby World Cup. She was named in the squad to the 2014 Women's Rugby World Cup.

References

1982 births
Living people
French female rugby union players